Hemisorghum is a genus of Asian plants in the grass family.

 Species
 Hemisorghum mekongense (A.Camus) C.E.Hubb. ex Bor  - Laos, Myanmar, Thailand, Vietnam
 Hemisorghum venustum (Thwaites) Clayton - Sri Lanka, Tamil Nadu

References

Andropogoneae
Grasses of Asia
Poaceae genera
Taxa named by Charles Edward Hubbard